The Residences at the Ritz-Carlton Grand Cayman Legends Championship is an event in the Outback Champions Series for senior tennis players. It is held each year in Grand Cayman.

Finals results

2008
Jim Courier defeated Wayne Ferreira 7-6 (3), 7-6 (1)

2008 establishments in the Cayman Islands
Champions Series (senior men's tennis tour)
Recurring sporting events established in 2008